Vyacheslav Semyonovich Spesivtsev (born 6 February 1943, in Moscow) is a Russian and Soviet actor and director. People's Artist of Russia (2010)

He graduated from the Gerasimov Institute of Cinematography. From 1966 director of the Taganka Theatre Studio in Moscow. Currently heading one of the independent theatres in Moscow.

References

External links

 biography, interview, picture gallery

1943 births
Living people
Russian male actors
Soviet male actors
People's Artists of Russia
Russian theatre directors
Soviet theatre directors